Josué de Sousa Montello (August 21, 1917 – March 15, 2006) was a Brazilian writer and diplomat and a former president of the Brazilian Academy of Letters.

Biography

First years and teenagerhood 
He was born in São Luís do Maranhão on August 21, 1917. He was the son of Antônio Bernardo Montello and Mância de Sousa Montello. He began his studies in São Luís do Maranhão, publishing his first literary works in A Mocidade, a journal at his school, the Liceu Maranhense.

Career 
In 1932, he joined the Literature Society Cenáculo Graça Aranha, where the writers of Maranhão with modernist affiliations gathered. Until 1936, he contributed to the main newspapers in Maranhão. He then moved to Belém do Pará, where he was elected, at the age of 18, as a permanent member of the Historical and Geographic Institute of Pará. At the end of 1936, he moved to Rio de Janeiro, becoming part of the group that founded the literature weekly Dom Casmurro. In the same period, he wrote for other publications, such as Careta, O Malho and Ilustração Brasileira, in addition to daily newspapers. He published his first novel, Janelas Fechadas, in 1941.

Six years later he was appointed director-general of the National Library, also serving as director of the National Theater Service. In 1953, at the invitation of the Itamaraty, he inaugurated and ran for two years the chair of Brazilian Studies at the Universidad Nacional Mayor de San Marcos, in Lima, Peru. From 1954, he became a permanent contributor to Jornal do Brasil, in which he maintained a weekly column until 1990. Again invited by the Foreign Ministry, in 1957, he held the chair of Brazilian Studies at the University of Lisbon and, in 1958, at the University of Madrid.

Between 1969 and 1970, he held the position of cultural advisor to the Brazilian Embassy in Paris, and from 1985 to 1989 he was Brazil's ambassador to UNESCO. From January 1994 to December 1995, he held the presidency of the Brazilian Academy of Letters. He was a member of countless academies and cultural institutions in Brazil and abroad.

Montello was the fourth occupant of Chair 29 of the Brazilian Academy of Letters, to which he was elected on November 4, 1954, in succession to Cláudio de Sousa. He was received by Viriato Correia on June 4, 1955, and he in turn received the academics Cândido Mota Filho, José Sarney, José Guilherme Merquior, Evaristo de Morais Filho, Roberto Marinho and Evandro Lins e Silva. He chaired the Brazilian Academy in 1994 and 1995.

Death 
He died in Rio de Janeiro on March 15, 2006.

References

Brazilian writers
Brazilian diplomats